Sai Jinhua (circa 1872-1936) was a Chinese courtesan who became the acquaintance of Alfred von Waldersee. Her real family name was Cao. Sometimes she said her family name was Zhao. During her career as a courtesan she used the names Fu Caiyun, Sai Jinhua, and Cao Menglan. Her art name (hao) was Weizhao Lingfei. Some people referred to her as Sai Erye.

Wenxian Zhang, author of an encyclopedia article on Sai Jinhua, wrote that she "was regarded by some as a cross-cultural courtesan." Wan Xianchu, an author of an encyclopedia article on Sai Jinhua, wrote that "regardless of whether Sai Jinhua's role in China's foreign relations may have been exaggerated and despite the controversies surrounding her conduct and affairs, she lived a tough and spectacular life that has assured her a place in the modern history of China."

Biography

Early life

Sai Jinhua was allegedly born with the name Zhao Lingfei on October 9, 1872. Sai Jinhua was from Yancheng, Jiangsu and she lived in Suzhou as a child. Her ancestral home was Xiuning, Anhui. At age 13 she became a prostitute after her father died and financial difficulties for her family occurred. She first became a prostitute while on a flower boat. At that time she used the professional name "Fu Caiyun". In 1887 Hong Jun, a major Chinese official, met Sai Jinhua while he visited Suzhou. At the time Hong Jun was in mourning due to his mother's death. Hong Jun made Sai Jinhua his concubine one year after meeting her. When she became his concubine she began using the name Hong Mengluan. In April of that year, Sai Jinhua went to Beijing with Hong Jun.

Empress Dowager Cixi appointed Hong Jun as the Chinese envoy to Europe, and so Hong Jun traveled to Russia, Austria, the Netherlands, and Germany as part of his diplomatic duties. Sai Jinhua accompanied him for the five year term because Hong Jun's wife was unwilling to travel with him. Sai Jinhua lived in Europe for three years.

In Berlin, Hong Jun did not allow Sai Jinhua to attend most of his parties, including those that he held at his residence. She was unable to dance at the parties she did attend due to her bound feet and because Hong Jun asked her not to. Wenxian Zhang, author of the Encyclopedia of Prostitution and Sex Work, Volume 2, wrote that when Sai Jinhua was in Berlin, she reportedly became the acquaintance of Alfred von Waldersee. David Der-wei Wang, author of Fin-de-siècle Splendor: Repressed Modernities of Late Qing Fiction, 1849-1911, wrote that the affair between Sai Jinhua and Waldersee began at that point as legends have it. In addition to Waldersee, she met Emperor William II, Chancellor Otto von Bismarck, and German Empress Victoria in Berlin. She had also visited St. Petersburg, Vienna, The Hague, Paris, and London. After the end of the diplomatic tour, the couple moved to Beijing.

Sai Jinhua gave birth to her daughter Deguan in 1890. Hong Jun died in 1893, shortly after his return to China. In 1894 Sai Jinhua became a prostitute again because Hong Jun's relatives did not support her financially. Sai Jinhua and her daughter Deguan had accompanied the coffin of Hong Jun as it was returned to Suzhou. When she resumed her prostitution career she used the stage name "Cao Menglan". She became a celebrity since she had been in a relationship with a Chinese envoy to Europe. In 1898, she had to move her business out of Shanghai. After re-establishing it in Tianjin she took the name "Sai Jinhua". Several years after restarting her prostitution career she started the Golden Flower Troupe, a courtesan theater company. This troupe became known in Beijing and Tianjin. Her prostitution business moved to Beijing in 1899.

Boxer Rebellion
In 1900 Waldersee became the chief commander of the occupation army after the end of the Boxer Rebellion. Sai Jinhua renewed her connection with Waldersee. Ying Hu, author of Tales of Translation: Composing the New Woman in China, 1899-1918, stated that Waldersee much favored Sai Jinhua allegedly due to her proficiency in several European languages. Ying Hu wrote that she allegedly tried and sometimes succeeded in curbing the brutality of the troops through her bedside conversations with Waldersee. Wenxian Zhang wrote that Sai Jinhua "was credited with influencing Waldsee to moderate the harsh treatment of Beijing residents." After the end of the Boxer-related hostilities, Sai Jinhua continued to be a prostitute. Wenxian Zhang wrote that the Qing Dynasty government was not grateful for her efforts.

Fan Zengxiang wrote some poems about Sai Jinhua and Waldersee. David Der-wei Wang wrote that the poems consolidated the legend. The poem repeated a rumor stating that the two were in the palace of the Empress Dowager and that they ran out of it naked when a fire occurred. Sai Jinhua, in her biography, admitted that she was on good terms with Waldersee but, as stated by Hu Ying, she vigorously disputed that she had a sexual relationship with him. Dewei Wang wrote that because of several reasons, including differences in political concerns, social status, and age, a romance between the two had not likely happened. David Wang wrote that "It is believed, however, that Sai Jinhua might have had contacts with some lower-ranking German officers at the time, thanks to her ability to speak a little German."

Later life

In 1903, along Shaanxi Lane, Sai Jinhua created a Nanban, or a southern prostitute troupe. She capitalized on the rumors of her romance with Waldersee and became very popular. In 1905 Fengling, a courtesan working under Sai Jinhua's direction, committed suicide, Authorities charged Sai Jinhua of torturing Fengling, causing her to commit suicide. She was placed in prison due to the charge and spent most of her funds having the charges reduced to manslaughter. Sai Jinhua was expelled from Beijing, and therefore banished to her hometown. In 1908 her daughter Deguan died.

She married a railroad official, Huang, in 1908. He died in the beginning of the Republican Era. Afterwards she had lived with a Mr. Cao. Subsequently she married a member of the National Assembly, Wei Sijiong, who was a former head of the Jiangxi Province Bureau of Civil Affairs. On 20 June 1918 they married in Shanghai. Sai Jinhua adopted the art name (hao) Weizhao Lingfei, which used a combination of her family name with that of her husband, to show her devotion to him. The couple moved to Beijing (then romanized as Peking). Sai Jinhua's mother died in 1922. Wei Sijiong, Sai Jinhua's husband, died shortly afterwards and his family refused to allow Sai Jinhua to share his property. The widow began smoking opium and she lived in solitude in her remaining years. Sai Jinhua, who was in poverty at the time of her death, subsisted off of the money curious historians and journalists gave her.

Sai Jinhua died in 1936, succumbing to an illness at 62 sui. At the time of her death, Beijing (then known as Peiping) was experiencing a strong winter. A servant found her body the morning after her death. Sai Jinhua was buried in Beijing. Qi Baishi, a well-known calligrapher, crafted her headstone.

Legacy

The life of Sai Jinhua had been adapted into several films, plays, and television series. In works she is portrayed as a heroine of the Chinese nation who saved the country single-handedly during a time of crisis or as a yaonie, a woman with abnormal powers or a female demon. Ying Hu, author of Tales of Translation: Composing the New Woman in China, 1899-1918, wrote that Sai Jinhua "is often portrayed in extreme colors" in fiction.

Ying Hu wrote that "portraits of Sai Jinhua in the first decade of the twentieth century tended to be ambivalent, if not outright censorious." Hu Baoyu by Wu Jianren and Fantianlu conglu ("Anecdotes Collected from the Fantianlu Studio") refer to her negatively. The character Fu Caiyun in Niehai Hua is based on Sai Jinhua. Ying Hu wrote that Sai Jinhua's portrayal in that work was "resolutely ambiguous." In the Nine-tailed Turtle the main character Zhang Qiugu has sexual intercourse with Sai Jinhua. Unlike other portrayals of Sai Jinhua in fiction, in The Nine-tailed Turtle she is portrayed as past her prime.

Beginning in the 1930s several works portrayed Sai Jinhua in a positive manner. In 1933 Liu Bannong, a professor of Chinese literature at Peking University, conducted an interview with Sai Jinhua. He wrote The Wife of Zhuangyuan: Sai Jinhua, which he called her true story. Wan Xianchu wrote that the Xia Yan drama Sai Jinhua "was a particularly influential work." The writing on the play's title page, "The country is everyone's country; to save the country is everyone's duty", is in Sai Jinhua's own handwriting. Jung Chang wrote that Sai Jinhua was "regarded by many as something of a tragic heroine."

The play The Beauty is also about Sai Jinhua. In 2012 Liu Xiaoqing, who was a prominent actress in the 1980s, played Sai Jinhua in a performance of The Beauty. Chang Dai-chien, a painter, made a stone engraving portrait of Sai Jinhua.

References
 Hu, Ying. Tales of Translation: Composing the New Woman in China, 1899-1918. Stanford University Press, 2000. , 9780804737746.
  Lévy, André. "Fleur sur l'océan des péchés". (book review of Niehai Hua, Archive). Études chinoises, No. 1, 1982.
 McMahon, Keith. Polygamy and Sublime Passion: Sexuality in China on the Verge of Modernity. University of Hawaii Press, 2010. , 9780824833763.
 Wan, Xianchu. Translation: Poon Shuk Wah. "Sai Jinhua." In: Lee, Lily Xiao Hong and A. D. Stefanowska (editors of entire work). Ho, Clara Wing-chung (The Qing Period Editor). Biographical Dictionary of Chinese Women The Qing Period, 1844-1911. M.E. Sharpe, January 1, 1998. , 9780765618276.
 Wang, David Der-wei. Fin-de-siècle Splendor: Repressed Modernities of Late Qing Fiction, 1849-1911. Stanford University Press, 1997. , 9780804728454.
 Zhang, Wenxian. "Sai Jinhua." In: Ditmore, Melissa Hope (editor). Encyclopedia of Prostitution and Sex Work, Volume 2. Greenwood Publishing Group, January 1, 2006. , 9780313329708.
 Zurndorfer, H. et al. (editors) Nan Nü: Men, Women, and Gender in Early and Imperial China, Volume 1. Brill Publishers, 1999.

Notes

Further reading
In English:
 McAleavy, Henry. That Chinese Woman: The Life of Sai-chin-hua. George Allen and Unwin (London), 1959.

In Chinese:
 Chen, Fan. Huashuo Sai Jinhua. Mingren zhuanji. 1988. Issue #6.
 Ke, Xing. Qingmo mingji Sai Jinhua zhuan ( "Biography of late Qing Dynasty courtesan Sai Jinhua"). Huayi chubanshe (Beijing), August 1995. . - There may be a 1992 printing too.
 Liu, Bannong and Shang Hongkui. Sai Jinhua benshi. Xingyuntang shudian (Beiping), 1934.
 Republished by Yuelu shushe (Changsha), 1985, Unified Book Number: 11285-42.
 Republished by China Renmin University Press, May 2006, .
 Sun, Zhen (editor). Sai Jinhua qiren. Chongqing chubanshe (Chongqing), 1987. - See entry in Google Books
 Tong, Xun. "Sai Jinhua". In: Qingdai renwu zhuangao, Ser 2. Liaoning People's Publishing House (Shenyang), 1992. Volume 7, p. 339-342. .
 Wan, Xianchu. Zhong Guo Ming Ji ("Famous Prostitutes of Ancient China"). Xiapu Press, Taipei, 1994.
 Wang, Jianyuan (editor). Mingji Sai Jinhua yishi. Jilin wenshi chubanshe (Changchun), 1986. - See Google Books page
 Zeng, Fan. Sai Jinhua waizhuan ("Unofficial Biography of Sai Jinhua"). Daguang shuju (Shanghai), 1936.
 Zhang, Cixi (editor). Lingfei ji. Tianjin shuju (Tianjin), 1939.
 Zhao, Shuxia (S: 赵淑侠, P: Zhào Shūxiá). Sai Jinhua. Beijing Shiyue Wenyi Chubanshe (Beijing), October 1990. . - See Google Books page, See Douban page

In German:
 Minden, Stephan von. Die merkwürdige Geschichte der Sai Jinhua.: Historisch-philologische Untersuchung zur Entstehung und Verbreitung einer Legende aus der Zeit des Boxeraufstandes. (Volume 70 of Münchener ostasiatische Studien, ISSN 0170-3668) Franz Steiner Verlag, 1994. , 9783515066150.
 Schwarz, Rainier. "Sai Jinhua und das Ketteler-Denkmal." (Archive) Nachrichten der Gesellschaft für Natur- und Völkerkunde Ostasiens (NOAG), University of Hamburg. Volume 78, Issues 183–184 (2008). p. 149-166.

External links

 "勾栏胭脂：赛金花两句话拯救故宫天安门." (Archive) Sina.

1872 births
1936 deaths
Boxer Rebellion
Chinese courtesans
People from Huangshan
Burials in Beijing